"L.A., L.A." is a song about Los Angeles by American hip hop duo Capone-N-Noreaga, featuring guest appearances from fellow American rappers Mobb Deep and Tragedy Khadafi. It was released in early 1996, as the second single from their debut album The War Report (1997).

The original version with the "New York, New York" beat was released in 1995. Soon after, Marley Marl remixed both the Kuwait and Iraq versions and both were released together in 1996.

The song was written as a response to West Coast hip hop duo Tha Dogg Pound's single "New York, New York", in which members of Tha Dogg Pound are seen knocking down buildings in New York City, in its music video.

Background 
Tha Dogg Pound is from California and at the height of the East Coast-West Coast Conflict many people in New York saw this as disrespect. The music video shows the rappers Capone N Noreaga kidnapping members of Tha Dogg Pound (Kurupt and Daz Dillinger) and putting them in the trunk of a car. Capone throws Kurupt off a roof after he attempts to escape. At the end they torture Daz to death and throw his corpse off the 59th Street Bridge.

References

External links 

mtv.com
 

1995 songs
1996 singles
Capone-N-Noreaga songs
Mobb Deep songs
Songs about Los Angeles
Diss tracks
Answer songs
Song recordings produced by Marley Marl
Songs written by Havoc (musician)
Songs written by Prodigy (rapper)
Songs written by N.O.R.E.